Mannar Hospital is a government hospital in Mannar, Sri Lanka. It is the leading hospital in Mannar District and is controlled by the provincial government in Jaffna. As of 2010 it had 350 beds. The hospital is sometimes called Mannar District General Hospital or Mannar Base Hospital.

References

Buildings and structures in Mannar, Sri Lanka
Hospitals in Mannar District
Provincial government hospitals in Sri Lanka